Josephine Pucci (born December 27, 1990) is a former women's ice hockey player for the Harvard Crimson women's ice hockey program who made her debut for the United States women's national ice hockey team  at the 2011 IIHF Women's World Championship.

Playing career

NCAA

2009–2010 season
Her freshman year with Harvard was during the 2009–10 season. Pucci participated in 31 games and accumulated 13 points on four goals and nine assists. Her contributions helped Harvard rank fifth in the nation in scoring defense. On November 21, 2009, she registered a season high three assists in one game versus Brown. Four days later, she scored a power play goal and assisted on the game-winning goal against Dartmouth.

2010–2011 season
In her sophomore year, Pucci led all Harvard defenders with 25 points on 12 goals and 13 assists, and led the team with a +24 rating.

USA hockey
From April 4 to 12, 2011, she was one of 30 players that took part in a selection / training camp. She was named to the final roster that participated at the 2011 IIHF Women's World Championship. Pucci was named to the U.S. roster that traveled to the Four Nations Cup from Nov. 9–13, 2011 in Sweden.

Player profile
Pucci was a defenseman and a captain for the Crimson's 2012–2013 season.

Awards and honors
ECAC Hockey Rookie of the Week (Week of November 30, 2009)
2010–11 New England Women's Division I All-Stars
2010–11 All-Ivy League first team
2010–11 All-ECAC Hockey second-team honors
2012 Patty Kazmaier Memorial Award Nominee

References

1990 births
Living people
American women's ice hockey defensemen
Harvard Crimson women's ice hockey players
Ice hockey players from New York (state)
Ice hockey players at the 2014 Winter Olympics
Medalists at the 2014 Winter Olympics
Olympic silver medalists for the United States in ice hockey
People from Pearl River, New York